The Kirwan Institute for the Study of Race and Ethnicity, also known simply as the Kirwan Institute, is an interdisciplinary research institute at Ohio State University in Columbus, Ohio, dedicated to the study of issues related to race and ethnicity. It was founded in May 2003 and is named after William English Kirwan, the former president of the Ohio State University. The executive director is Darrick Hamilton. John A. Powell served as the Institute's founding director until the end of December 2011, when he was replaced by Sharon L. Davies. Davies was, in turn, replaced by Hamilton on January 1, 2019.

References

External links

Organizations established in 2003
Ohio State University
2003 establishments in Ohio
Organizations based in Columbus, Ohio
Research institutes in Ohio